CertiK, also known as Certified Kernel Tech, is a web3, blockchain and smart contract security firm. CertiK provides a Security Leaderboard, a tool that ranks WEB3 projects on security risk, based on a range of on-chain security primitives. The leaderboard provides insight into the security risk of different web3 smart contracts and blockchains projects while tracking other data points such as market capitalization. CertiK also provides a KYC product which is an advanced vetting and investigations service in Web3 with a methodology designed to detect all levels of risk by independently verifying the legitimacy of a project and its team.

References

External links

Blockchain entities
American companies established in 2018
Technology companies based in New York City
Auditing